

Main series

1500 series 
Blue Note made the switch to 12" albums late in 1955. The Modern Jazz Series (see the 5000 series below) continued with the following 12" LPs. Many of these were issued in both monaural versions (BLP series) and stereo versions (BST 81500 series), sometimes in electronically rechanneled stereo. In certain cases, the stereo versions of recordings from 1957 onwards only appeared many years later. Beginning in 1956 with BLP 1509, Reid Miles designed most of the Blue Note LP covers. The 1500 series has been systematically reissued by Toshiba-EMI in Japan ("Blue Note Works 1500" series, 20-bit 88.2 kHz CDs); the catalog numbers are TOCJ-1501, etc. In addition, originally unissued material from these dates was made available of Toshiba's 1600 series (20-bit 88.2 kHz CDs).
1501: Miles Davis - Miles Davis Volume 1 (5/9/52, 4/20/53)
1502: Miles Davis - Miles Davis Volume 2 (5/9/52, 4/20/53, 3/6/54)
1503: Bud Powell - The Amazing Bud Powell, Vol. 1 (8/9/49, 5/1/51)
1504: Bud Powell - The Amazing Bud Powell, Vol. 2 (5/1/51, 8/14/53)
1505: J. J. Johnson - The Eminent Jay Jay Johnson Volume 1 (6/22/53, 9/24/54)
1506: J. J. Johnson - The Eminent Jay Jay Johnson Volume 2 (6/22/53, 9/24/54, 6/6/55)
1507: Art Blakey and the Jazz Messengers - At the Cafe Bohemia, Vol. 1 (11/23/55)
1508: Art Blakey and the Jazz Messengers - At the Cafe Bohemia, Vol. 2 (11/23/55)
1509: Milt Jackson - Milt Jackson and the Thelonious Monk Quintet (7/2/48, 7/23/51, 4/7/52)
1510: Thelonious Monk - Genius of Modern Music, Volume 1 (10/15/47, 10/24/47, 11/21/47)
1511: Thelonious Monk - Genius of Modern Music, Volume 2 (10/15/47, 10/24/47, 7/23/51, 5/30/52)
1512: Jimmy Smith - A New Sound, A New Star, Volume 1 (2/18/56)
1513: Thad Jones - Detroit-New York Junction (3/13/56)
1514: Jimmy Smith - A New Sound, A New Star, Volume 2 (3/11/56)
1515: Jutta Hipp - At the Hickory House, Volume 1 (4/5/56)
1516: Jutta Hipp - At the Hickory House, Volume 2 (4/5/56)
1517: Gil Mellé - Patterns in Jazz (4/1/56)
1518: Horace Silver - Horace Silver and the Jazz Messengers (11/13/54, 2/6/55)
1519: Herbie Nichols - Herbie Nichols Trio (8/7/55, 4/19/56)
1520: Horace Silver and Art Blakey / Sabu - Horace Silver Trio and Art Blakey-Sabu (10/9/52, 11/23/53)
1521: Art Blakey - A Night at Birdland, Vol. 1 (2/21/54)
1522: Art Blakey - A Night at Birdland, Vol. 2 (2/21/54)
1523: Kenny Burrell - Introducing Kenny Burrell (5/29/56, 5/30/56)
1524: Kenny Dorham - 'Round About Midnight at the Cafe Bohemia (5/31/56)
1525: Jimmy Smith - The Incredible Jimmy Smith, Volume 3 (6/17/56)
1526: Clifford Brown - Memorial Album (6/9/53, 8/28/53)
1527: Thad Jones - The Magnificent Thad Jones (7/14/56)
1528: Jimmy Smith - At Club Baby Grand, Volume 1 (8/4/56)
1529: Jimmy Smith - At Club Baby Grand, Volume 2 (8/4/56)
1530: Jutta Hipp - Jutta Hipp with Zoot Sims (7/28/56)
1531: Fats Navarro - The Fabulous Fats Navarro, Volume 1 (9/26/47, 10/11/48, 8/9/49)
1532: Fats Navarro - The Fabulous Fats Navarro, Volume 2 (9/13/48, 10/11/48)
1533: Johnny Griffin - Introducing Johnny Griffin (4/17/56)
1534: Paul Chambers - Whims of Chambers (9/21/56)
1535: Kenny Dorham - Afro-Cuban (1/30/55, 3/29/55)
1536: J. R. Monterose - J. R. Monterose (10/21/56)
1537: Lou Donaldson - Quartet/Quintet/Sextet (6/20/52, 11/19/52)
1538: Lee Morgan - Lee Morgan Indeed! (11/4/56)
1539: Horace Silver - 6 Pieces of Silver (11/10/56)
1540: Hank Mobley - With Donald Byrd and Lee Morgan (11/25/56)
1541: Lee Morgan - Lee Morgan Vol. 2 (12/2/56)
1542: Sonny Rollins - Sonny Rollins, Vol. 1 (12/16/56)
1543: Kenny Burrell - Kenny Burrell Volume 2 (3/12/56, 5/29/56, 5/30/56)
1544: Hank Mobley - Hank Mobley and his All Stars (1/13/57)
1545: Lou Donaldson - Wailing with Lou (1/27/55)
1546: Thad Jones - The Magnificent Thad Jones, Volume 3 (7/14/56, 2/2/57)
1547: Jimmy Smith - A Date with Jimmy Smith Volume One (2/11/57, 2/13/57)
1548: Jimmy Smith - A Date with Jimmy Smith Volume Two (2/11/57)
1549: Cliff Jordan/John Gilmore - Blowing in from Chicago (3/3/57)
1550: Hank Mobley - With Farmer, Silver, Watkins, Blakey (3/8/57)
1551: Jimmy Smith - At the Organ, Volume 1 (2/12/57)
1552: Jimmy Smith - At the Organ, Volume 2 (2/12/57, 2/13/57)
1553: UNUSED
1554: Art Blakey - Orgy in Rhythm, Volume 1 (3/7/57)
1555: Art Blakey - Orgy in Rhythm, Volume 2 (3/7/57)
1556: Jimmy Smith - The Sounds of Jimmy Smith (2/11/57, 2/12/57, 2/13/57)
1557: Lee Morgan - Lee Morgan Vol. 3 (3/24/57)
1558: Sonny Rollins - Sonny Rollins, Vol. 2 (4/14/57)
1559: Johnny Griffin - A Blowin' Session (4/6/57)
1560: Hank Mobley - Hank (4/21/57)
1561: Sabu Martinez - Palo Congo (4/27/57)
1562: Horace Silver - The Stylings of Silver (5/8/57)
1563: Jimmy Smith - Plays Pretty Just for You (5/8/57)
1564: Paul Chambers - Paul Chambers Quintet (5/19/57)
1565: Clifford Jordan - Cliff Jordan (6/2/57)
1566: Lou Donaldson - Swing and Soul (6/9/57)
1567: Curtis Fuller - The Opener (6/16/57)
1568: Hank Mobley - Hank Mobley (6/23/57)
1569: Paul Chambers - Bass on Top (7/14/57)
1570: Sonny Clark - Dial "S" for Sonny (7/21/57)
1571: Bud Powell - Bud! The Amazing Bud Powell (Vol. 3) (8/3/57)
1572: Curtis Fuller - Bone & Bari (8/4/57)
1573: John Jenkins - John Jenkins with Kenny Burrell (8/11/57)
1574: Hank Mobley - Peckin' Time (2/9/58)
1575: Lee Morgan - City Lights (8/25/57)
1576: Sonny Clark - Sonny's Crib (9/1/57)
1577: John Coltrane - Blue Train (9/15/57)
1578: Lee Morgan - The Cooker (9/29/57)
1579: Sonny Clark - Sonny Clark Trio (9/13/57)
1580: Johnny Griffin - The Congregation (10/23/57)
1581: Sonny Rollins - A Night at the Village Vanguard (11/3/57)
1582: Clifford Jordan - Cliff Craft (11/10/57)
1583: Curtis Fuller - Curtis Fuller Volume 3 (12/1/57)
1584: Louis Smith - Here Comes Louis Smith (2/4/58)
1585: Jimmy Smith - Groovin' at Smalls' Paradise, Volume 1 (11/15/57)
1586: Jimmy Smith - Groovin' at Smalls' Paradise, Volume 2 (11/15/57)
1587: Bennie Green - Back on the Scene (3/23/58)
1588: Sonny Clark - Cool Struttin' (1/5/58)
1589: Horace Silver - Further Explorations (1/13/58)
1590: Lee Morgan - Candy (11/18/57, 2/2/58)
1591: Lou Donaldson - Lou Takes Off (12/15/57)
1592: Sonny Clark - [unissued] (12/8/57)
1593: Lou Donaldson - Blues Walk (7/28/58)
1594: Louis Smith - Smithville (3/30/58)
1595: Cannonball Adderley - Somethin' Else (3/9/58)
1596: Kenny Burrell - Blue Lights Volume 1 (5/14/58)
1597: Kenny Burrell - Blue Lights Volume 2 (5/14/58)
1598: Bud Powell - Time Waits: The Amazing Bud Powell (Vol. 4) (5/25/58)
1599: Bennie Green - Soul Stirrin' (4/28/58)
1600: The Three Sounds - Introducing the 3 Sounds (9/16/58, 9/18/58)

4000 series
The Modern Jazz Series continued into the 1970s with the LPs listed below. Many were issued in both monaural versions (BLP series) and stereo versions (BST 84000 series). Beginning with 4258 all subsequent LPs (with three exceptions: 4263, 4264, and 4265) were issued only in stereo. Most of the first 300 numbers of the 4000 series have been reissued by Toshiba-EMI in Japan ("Blue Note Works 4000" series); the catalog numbers are TOCJ-4###
4001: Sonny Rollins - Newk's Time (9/22/57)
4002: Jimmy Smith - House Party (8/25/57, 2/25/57)
4003: Art Blakey and the Jazz Messengers - Moanin' (10/30/58)
4004: Art Blakey - Holiday for Skins, Volume 1 (11/9/58)
4005: Art Blakey - Holiday for Skins, Volume 2 (11/9/58)
4006: Dizzy Reece - Blues in Trinity (8/24/58)
4007: Donald Byrd - Off to the Races (12/21/58)
4008: Horace Silver Quintet - Finger Poppin' (2/1/59)
4009: Bud Powell - The Scene Changes: The Amazing Bud Powell (Vol. 5) (12/29/58)
4010: Bennie Green - Walkin' & Talkin' (1/25/59)
4011: Jimmy Smith - The Sermon! (8/25/57, 2/25/58)
4012: Lou Donaldson with The Three Sounds - LD + 3 (2/18/59)
4013: Jackie McLean - New Soil (5/2/59)
4014: The Three Sounds - Bottoms Up! (2/11/59)
4015: Art Blakey - At the Jazz Corner of the World Vol. 1 (4/15/59)
4016: Art Blakey - At the Jazz Corner of the World Vol. 2 (4/15/59)
4017: Horace Silver - Blowin' the Blues Away (8/29/59, 8/30/59, 9/13/59)
4018: Walter Davis Jr. - Davis Cup (8/2/59)
4019: Donald Byrd - Byrd in Hand (5/31/59)
4020: The Three Sounds - Good Deal (5/20/59)
4021: Kenny Burrell with Art Blakey - On View at the Five Spot Cafe (8/25/59)
4022: Duke Pearson - Profile (10/25/59)
4023: Dizzy Reece - Star Bright (11/14/59, 11/19/59)
4024: Jackie McLean - Swing, Swang, Swingin' (10/20/59)
4025: Lou Donaldson - The Time Is Right (10/31/59, 11/28/59)
4026: Donald Byrd - Fuego (10/4/59)
4027: Freddie Redd - The Connection (2/15/60)
4028: Horace Parlan - Movin' & Groovin' (2/29/60)
4029: Art Blakey and the Jazz Messengers - The Big Beat (3/6/60)
4030: Jimmy Smith - Crazy! Baby (1/4/60)
4031: Hank Mobley - Soul Station (2/7/60)
4032: Sonny Red - Out of the Blue (1/23/60)
4033: Dizzy Reece - Soundin' Off (5/12/60)
4034: Lee Morgan - Lee-Way (4/28/60)
4035: Duke Pearson - Tender Feelin's (12/16/59)
4036: Lou Donaldson - Sunny Side Up (2/5/60, 2/28/60)
4037: Horace Parlan - Us Three (4/20/60)
4038: Jackie McLean - Capuchin Swing (4/17/60)
4039: Stanley Turrentine - Look Out! (6/18/60)
4040: Freddie Hubbard - Open Sesame (6/19/60)
4041: Tina Brooks - True Blue (6/25/60)
4042: Horace Silver Quintet - Horace-Scope (7/8/60, 7/9/60)
4043: Horace Parlan - Speakin' My Piece (7/14/60)
4044: The Three Sounds - Moods (6/28/60)
4045: Freddie Redd - Shades of Redd (8/13/60)
4046: Duke Jordan - Flight to Jordan (8/4/60)
4047: Art Taylor - A.T.'s Delight (8/6/60)
4048: Donald Byrd - Byrd in Flight (1/17/60, 1/25/60, 7/10/60)
4049: Art Blakey and the Jazz Messengers - A Night in Tunisia (8/14/60)
4050: Jimmy Smith - Home Cookin' (5/24/59, 6/16/59)
4051: Jackie McLean - Jackie's Bag (1/18/59)
4052: Tina Brooks - Back to the Tracks (9/1/60, 10/20/60)
4053: Lou Donaldson - Light-Foot (12/14/58)
4054: Art Blakey and the Jazz Messengers - Meet You at the Jazz Corner of the World Volume 1 (9/14/60)
4055: Art Blakey and the Jazz Messengers - Meet You at the Jazz Corner of the World Volume 2 (9/14/60)
4056: Freddie Hubbard - Goin' Up (11/6/60)
4057: Stanley Turrentine with the Three Sounds - Blue Hour (12/16/60)
4058: Hank Mobley - Roll Call (11/13/60)
4059: Kenny Drew - Undercurrent (12/11/60)
4060: Donald Byrd - At the Half Note Cafe, Volume 1 (11/11/60)
4061: Donald Byrd - At the Half Note Cafe, Volume 2 (11/11/60)
4062: Horace Parlan - Headin' South (12/6/60)
4063: Kenny Dorham - Whistle Stop (1/15/61)
4064: Grant Green - Grant's First Stand (1/28/61)
4065: Stanley Turrentine- Comin' Your Way (1/20/61)
4066: Lou Donaldson - Here 'Tis (1/23/61)
4067: Jackie McLean - Bluesnik (1/8/61)
4068: Baby Face Willette - Face to Face (1/30/61)
4069: Stanley Turrentine - Up at "Minton's", Volume 1 (2/23/61)
4070: Stanley Turrentine - Up at "Minton's", Volume 2 (2/23/61)
4071: Grant Green - Green Street (4/1/61)
4072: The Three Sounds - Feelin' Good (6/28/60)
4073: Freddie Hubbard - Hub Cap (4/9/61)
4074: Horace Parlan - On the Spur of the Moment (3/18/61)
4075: Donald Byrd - The Cat Walk (5/2/61)
4076: Horace Silver Quintet - Doin' the Thing (5/19/61, 5/20/61)
4077: Dexter Gordon - Doin' Allright (5/6/61)
4078: Jimmy Smith - Midnight Special (4/25/60)
4079: Lou Donaldson - Gravy Train (4/27/61)
4080: Hank Mobley - Workout (3/26/61)
4081: Stanley Turrentine - Dearly Beloved (6/8/61)
4082: Horace Parlan - Up & Down (6/18/61)
4083: Dexter Gordon - Dexter Calling... (5/9/61)
4084: Baby Face Willette - Stop and Listen (5/22/61)
4085: Freddie Hubbard - Ready for Freddie (8/21/61)
4086: Grant Green - Grantstand (8/1/61)
4087: Leo Parker - Let Me Tell You 'Bout It (9/9/61)
4088: The Three Sounds - Here We Come (12/13/60, 12/14/60)
4089: Jackie McLean - A Fickle Sonance (10/26/61)
4090: Art Blakey and the Jazz Messengers - Mosaic (10/2/61)
4091: Sonny Clark - Leapin' and Lopin' (11/13/61)
4092: Kenny Clarke - The Golden 8 (5/18/61, 5/19/61)
4093: Ike Quebec - Heavy Soul (11/26/61)
4094: Fred Jackson - Hootin' 'n Tootin' (2/5/62)
4095: Leo Parker - Rollin' with Leo (10/12/61, 10/20/61)
4096: Stanley Turrentine - That's Where It's At (1/2/62)
4097: Art Blakey - The African Beat (1/24/62)
4098: Ike Quebec - Blue & Sentimental (12/16/61, 12/23/61)
4099: Grant Green - Sunday Mornin' (6/4/61)
4100: Jimmy Smith - Plays Fats Waller (1/23/62)
4101: Donald Byrd - Royal Flush (9/21/61)
4102: The Three Sounds - Hey There (8/13/61)
4103: Ike Quebec - Congo Lament (1/20/62)
4104: Art Blakey - Buhaina's Delight (11/28/61, 12/18/61)
4105: Ike Quebec - It Might as Well Be Spring (12/9/61)
4106: Jackie McLean - Let Freedom Ring (3/19/62)
4107: Don Wilkerson - Preach Brother! (6/18/62)
4108: Lou Donaldson - The Natural Soul (5/9/62)
4109: Herbie Hancock - Takin' Off (5/28/62)
4110: Horace Silver - The Tokyo Blues (7/13/62, 7/14/62)
4111: Grant Green - The Latin Bit (4/26/62)
4112: Dexter Gordon - Go! (8/27/62)
4113: Freddie Roach - Down to Earth (8/23/62)
4114: Ike Quebec - Soul Samba (10/5/62)
4115: Freddie Hubbard - Hub-Tones (10/10/62)
4116: Jackie McLean - Jackie McLean Quintet (6/14/62) - not released
4117: Jimmy Smith - Back at the Chicken Shack (4/25/60)
4118: Donald Byrd - Free Form (12/11/61)
4119: Charlie Rouse - Bossa Nova Bacchanal (11/26/62)
4120: The Three Sounds - It Just Got to Be (12/13/60, 12/14/60)
4121: Don Wilkerson - Elder Don (5/3/62)
4122: Stanley Turrentine - Jubilee Shout!!! (10/18/62)
4123: Kenny Burrell - Midnight Blue (1/8/63)
4124: Donald Byrd - A New Perspective (1/12/63)
4125: Lou Donaldson - Good Gracious! (1/24/63)
4126: Herbie Hancock - My Point of View (3/19/63)
4127: Kenny Dorham - Una Mas (4/1/63)
4128: Freddie Roach - Mo' Greens Please (1/21/63, 3/11/63)
4129: Stanley Turrentine - Never Let Me Go (2/13/63)
4130: Big John Patton - Along Came John (4/5/63)
4131: Horace Silver - Silver's Serenade (5/7/63, 5/8/63)
4132: Grant Green - Feelin' the Spirit (12/21/62)
4133: Dexter Gordon - A Swingin' Affair (8/29/62)
4134: Horace Parlan - Happy Frame of Mind (2/15/63)
4135: Freddie Hubbard - Here to Stay (12/27/62)
4136: Solomon Ilori - African High Life (4/25/63)
4137: Jackie McLean - One Step Beyond (4/30/63)
4138: Harold Vick - Steppin' Out! (5/27/63)
4139: Grant Green - Am I Blue (5/16/63)
4140: Joe Henderson - Page One (6/3/63)
4141: Jimmy Smith - Rockin' the Boat (2/7/63)
4142: Blue Mitchell - Step Lightly (8/13/63)
4143: John Patton - Blue John (7/11/63, 8/2/63)
4144: Johnny Coles - Little Johnny C (7/18/63, 8/9/63)
4145: Don Wilkerson - Shoutin' (7/29/63)
4146: Dexter Gordon - Our Man in Paris (5/23/63)
4147: Herbie Hancock - Inventions and Dimensions (8/30/63)
4148: George Braith - Two Souls in One (9/4/63)
4149: Hank Mobley - No Room for Squares (3/7/63, 10/2/63)
4150: Stanley Turrentine - A Chip Off the Old Block (10/21/63)
4151: Andrew Hill - Black Fire (11/9/63)
4152: Joe Henderson - Our Thing (9/9/63)
4153: Grachan Moncur III - Evolution (11/21/63)
4154: Grant Green - Idle Moments (11/15/63)
4155: The Three Sounds - Black Orchid (3/7/62, 3/8/62)
4156: Art Blakey and the Jazz Messengers - The Freedom Rider (5/27/61)
4157: Lee Morgan - The Sidewinder (12/21/63)
4158: Freddie Roach - Good Move! (11/29/63, 12/9/63)
4159: Andrew Hill - Judgment! (1/8/64)
4160: Andrew Hill - Smokestack (12/13/63)
4161: George Braith - Soulstream (12/16/63)
4162: Stanley Turrentine - Hustlin' (1/24/64)
4163: Eric Dolphy - Out to Lunch! (2/25/64)
4164: Jimmy Smith - Prayer Meetin' (2/8/63)
4165: Jackie McLean - Destination... Out! (9/20/63)
4166: Joe Henderson - In 'n Out (4/10/64)
4167: Andrew Hill - Point of Departure (3/21/64)
4168: Freddie Roach - Brown Sugar (3/18/64, 3/19/64)
4169: Lee Morgan - Search for the New Land (2/15/64)
4170: Art Blakey and the Jazz Messengers - Free for All (2/10/64)
4171: George Braith - Extension (3/27/64)
4172: Freddie Hubbard - Breaking Point (5/7/64)
4173: Wayne Shorter - Night Dreamer (4/29/64)
4174: Big John Patton - The Way I Feel (6/19/64)
4175: Herbie Hancock - Empyrean Isles (6/17/64)
4176: Dexter Gordon - One Flight Up (6/2/64)
4177: Grachan Moncur III - Some Other Stuff (7/6/64)
4178: Blue Mitchell - The Thing to Do (7/30/64)
4179: Jackie McLean - It's Time! (8/5/64)
4180: Anthony Williams - Life Time (8/21/64, 8/24/64)
4181: Kenny Dorham - Trompeta Toccata (9/14/64)
4182: Wayne Shorter- Juju (8/3/64)
4183: Grant Green - Talkin' About! (9/11/64)
4184: Sam Rivers - Fuchsia Swing Song (12/11/64)
4185: Horace Silver - Song for My Father (10/31/63, 10/26/64)
4186: Hank Mobley - The Turnaround (3/7/63, 2/5/65)
4187: Larry Young - Into Somethin' (11/12/64)
4188: Donald Byrd - I'm Tryin' to Get Home (12/17/64, 12/18/64)
4189: Joe Henderson - Inner Urge (11/30/64)
4190: Freddie Roach - All That's Good (10/16/64)
4191: Duke Pearson - Wahoo! (11/21/64)
4192: Big John Patton - Oh Baby! (3/8/65)
4193: Art Blakey and the Jazz Messengers - Indestructible (4/24/64, 5/15/64)
4194: Wayne Shorter - Speak No Evil (12/24/64)
4195: Herbie Hancock - Maiden Voyage (3/17/65)
4196: Freddie Hubbard - Blue Spirits (2/19/65)
4197: The Three Sounds - Out of This World (2/4/62, 3/7/62, 3/8/62)
4198: Bobby Hutcherson - Dialogue (4/3/65)
4199: Lee Morgan - The Rumproller (4/21/65)
4200: Jimmy Smith - Softly as a Summer Breeze (2/28/58)
4201: Stanley Turrentine - Joyride (4/14/65)
4202: Grant Green - I Want to Hold Your Hand (3/31/65)
4203: Andrew Hill - Andrew!!! (6/25/64)
4204: Dexter Gordon - Gettin' Around (5/28/65, 5/29/65)
4205: Pete La Roca - Basra (5/19/65)
4206: Sam Rivers - Contours (5/21/65)
4207: Freddie Hubbard - The Night of the Cookers, Volume 1 (4/10/65)
4208: Freddie Hubbard - The Night of the Cookers, Volume 2 (4/9/65)
4209: Hank Mobley - Dippin' (6/18/65)
4210: Ornette Coleman - Town Hall Concert, Volume 1 (12/21/62)
4211: Ornette Coleman - Town Hall Concert, Volume 2 (12/21/62)
4212: Lee Morgan - The Gigolo (6/25/65, 7/1/65)
4213: Bobby Hutcherson - Components (6/10/65)
4214: Blue Mitchell - Down with It! (7/14/65)
4215: Jackie McLean - Right Now! (1/29/65)
4216: Anthony Williams - Spring (8/12/65)
4217: Andrew Hill - Compulsion (10/8/65)
4218: Jackie McLean - Action Action Action (9/16/64)
4219: Wayne Shorter - The All Seeing Eye (10/15/65)
4220: Horace Silver - The Cape Verdean Blues (10/1/65)
4221: Larry Young - Unity (11/10/65)
4222: Lee Morgan - Cornbread (9/18/65)
4223: Jackie McLean - Jacknife (9/24/65)
4224: Ornette Coleman - At the "Golden Circle," Volume 1 (12/3/65)
4225: Ornette Coleman - At the "Golden Circle," Volume 2 (12/4/65)
4226: Don Cherry - Complete Communion (12/24/65)
4227: Joe Henderson - Mode for Joe (1/27/66)
4228: Blue Mitchell - Bring It Home to Me (1/6/66)
4229: John Patton - Got a Good Thing Goin' (4/29/66)
4230: Hank Mobley - A Caddy for Daddy (12/18/65)
4231: Bobby Hutcherson - Happenings (2/8/66)
4232: Wayne Shorter - Adam's Apple (2/3/66, 2/24/66)
4233: Andrew Hill - Change (3/7/66)
4234: Stanley Turrentine - In Memory Of (6/3/64, 9/4/64)
4235: Jimmy Smith - Bucket! (2/1/63)
4236: Jackie McLean -Jacknife (4/18/66)
4237: Cecil Taylor - Unit Structures (5/19/66)
4238: Donald Byrd - Mustang! (6/24/66)
4239: John Patton - Let 'Em Roll (12/11/65)
4240: Stanley Turrentine - Rough 'n' Tumble (7/1/66)
4241: Hank Mobley - A Slice of the Top (3/18/66, 6/17/66)
4242: Larry Young - Of Love and Peace (7/28/66)
4243: Lee Morgan - Delightfulee (4/8/66, 5/27/66)
4244: Bobby Hutcherson - Stick-Up! (7/14/66)
4245: Art Blakey- Like Someone in Love (8/7/60, 8/14/60)
4246: Ornette Coleman - The Empty Foxhole (9/9/66)
4247: Don Cherry - Symphony for Improvisers (9/19/66)
4248: The Three Sounds - Vibrations (10/25/66)
4249: Sam Rivers - A New Conception (10/11/66)
4250: Horace Silver - The Jody Grind (11/2/66, 11/23/66)
4251: Jack Wilson - Something Personal (8/9/66, 8/10/66)
4252: Duke Pearson - Sweet Honey Bee (12/7/66)
4253: Grant Green - Street of Dreams (11/16/64)
4254: Lou Donaldson - Lush Life (1/20/67)
4255: Jimmy Smith - I'm Movin' On (1/31/63)
4256: Stanley Turrentine - The Spoiler (9/22/66)
4257: Blue Mitchell - Boss Horn (11/17/66)
4258: Art Blakey and the Jazz Messengers - The Witch Doctor (3/14/61)
4259: Donald Byrd - Blackjack (1/9/67)
4260: Cecil Taylor - Conquistador! (10/6/66)
4261: Sam Rivers - Dimensions & Extensions (3/17/67)
4262: Jackie McLean - New and Old Gospel (3/24/67)
4263: Lou Donaldson - Alligator Bogaloo (4/7/67)
4264: McCoy Tyner - The Real McCoy (4/21/67)
4265: The Three Sounds - Live at the Lighthouse (6/9/67, 6/10/67)
4266: Larry Young - Contrasts (9/18/67)
4267: Duke Pearson - The Right Touch (9/13/67)
4268: Stanley Turrentine - Easy Walker (7/8/66)
4269: Jimmy Smith - Open House (3/22/60)
4270: Jack Wilson - Easterly Winds (9/22/67)
4271: Lou Donaldson - Mr. Shing-A-Ling (10/27/67)
4272: Blue Mitchell - Heads Up! (11/17/67)
4273: Hank Mobley - Hi Voltage (10/9/67)
4274: Tyrone Washington - Natural Essence (12/29/67)
4275: McCoy Tyner - Tender Moments (12/1/67)
4276: Duke Pearson - Introducing Duke Pearson's Big Band (12/15/67)
4277: Horace Silver - Serenade to a Soul Sister (2/23/68, 3/29/68)
4278: Frank Foster - Manhattan Fever (3/21/68)
4279: Herbie Hancock - Speak Like a Child (3/5/68, 3/6/68)
4280: Lou Donaldson - Midnight Creeper (3/15/68)
4281: John Patton - That Certain Feeling (3/8/68)
4282: Elvin Jones - Puttin' It Together (4/8/68)
4283: Booker Ervin - The In Between (1/12/68)
4284: Jackie McLean - 'Bout Soul (9/8/67)
4285: The Three Sounds - Coldwater Flat (4/11/68, 4/12/68, 4/15/68)
4286: Stanley Turrentine - The Look of Love (4/15/68)
4287: Ornette Coleman - New York Is Now! (4/29/68, 5/7/68)
4288: Hank Mobley - Reach Out! (1/19/68)
4289: Lee Morgan - Caramba! (5/3/68)
4290: Lonnie Smith - Think! (7/23/68)
4291: Bobby Hutcherson - Total Eclipse (7/12/68)
4292: Donald Byrd - Slow Drag (5/12/67)
4293: Duke Pearson - The Phantom (9/11/68)
4294: Eddie Gale - Ghetto Music (9/20/68)
4295: Reuben Wilson - On Broadway (10/4/68)
4296: Jimmy Smith - Plain Talk (3/22/60)
4297: Wayne Shorter - Schizophrenia (3/10/67)
4298: Stanley Turrentine - Always Something There (10/14/68, 10/28/68)
4299: Lou Donaldson - Say It Loud! (11/6/68)
4300: Blue Mitchell - Collision in Black (9/11/68, 9/12/68)
4301: The Three Sounds - Elegant Soul (9/19/68, 9/20/68)
4302: Kenny Cox - Introducing Kenny Cox (12/9/68)
4303: Andrew Hill - Grass Roots (8/5/68)
4304: Larry Young - Heaven on Earth (2/9/68)
4305: Elvin Jones - The Ultimate (9/6/68)
4306: John Patton - Understanding (10/25/68)
4307: McCoy Tyner - Time for Tyner (5/17/68)
4308: Duke Pearson - Now Hear This (12/2/68, 12/3/68)
4309: Horace Silver - You Gotta Take a Little Love (1/10/69, 1/17/69)
4310: Grant Green - Goin' West (11/30/62)
4311: Don Cherry - Where Is Brooklyn? (11/11/66)
4312: Lee Morgan - Charisma (9/29/66)
4313: Lonnie Smith - Turning Point (1/3/69)
4314: Booker Ervin (unissued) (5/24/68)
4315: Stanley Turrentine - Common Touch (8/30/68)
4316: Frank Foster (unissued) (1/31/69)
4317: Reuben Wilson - Love Bug (3/21/69)
4318: Lou Donaldson - Hot Dog (4/25/69)
4319: Donald Byrd - Fancy Free (5/9/69, 6/6/69)
4320: Eddie Gale - Black Rhythm Happening (5/2/69)
4321: Herbie Hancock - The Prisoner (4/18/69, 4/21/69, 4/23/69)
4322: Brother Jack McDuff - Down Home Style (6/10/69)
4323: Duke Pearson - Merry Ole Soul (2/25/69, 8/19/69)
4324: Blue Mitchell - Bantu Village (5/22/69, 5/23/69)
4325: Horace Silver - The Best of Horace Silver (compilation)
4326: Lonnie Smith - Move Your Hand (8/9/69)
4327: Grant Green - Carryin' On (10/3/69)
4328: Jack Wilson - Song for My Daughter (9/28/68, 12/16/68, 4/23/69)
4329: Hank Mobley - The Flip (7/12/69)
4330: Andrew Hill - Lift Every Voice (5/16/69)
4331: Elvin Jones - Poly-Currents (9/26/69)
4332: Wayne Shorter - Super Nova (8/29/69, 9/2/69)
4333: Bobby Hutcherson - Now! (11/5/69)
4334: Brother Jack McDuff - Moon Rappin' (12/1/69, 12/2/69)
4335: Lee Morgan - The Sixth Sense (11/10/67)
4336: Stanley Turrentine - Another Story (3/3/69)
4337: Lou Donaldson - Everything I Play Is Funky (8/22/69)
4338: McCoy Tyner - Expansions (8/23/68)
4339: Kenny Cox - Multidirection (11/26/69)
4340: John Patton - Accent on the Blues (8/15/69)
4341: The Three Sounds - Soul Symphony (9/26/69)
4342: Grant Green - Green Is Beautiful (1/30/70)
4343: Reuben Wilson - Blue Mode (12/12/69)
4344: Duke Pearson - How Insensitive (4/11/69, 4/14/69, 5/5/69)
4345: Jackie McLean - Demon's Dance (12/22/67)
4346: The Thad Jones/ Mel Lewis Orchestra - Consummation (1/20/70, 1/21/70, 1/28/70, 5/25/70)
4347: Art Blakey and the Jazz Messengers - Roots & Herbs (2/18/61)
4348: Brother Jack McDuff - To Seek a New Home (3/23/70, 3/24/70, 3/26/70)
4349: Donald Byrd - Electric Byrd (5/15/70)
4350: Jimmy McGriff - Electric Funk (9/??/69)
4351: Lonnie Smith - Drives (1/2/70)
4352: Horace Silver - That Healin' Feelin' (4/8/70, 6/18/70)
4353: Chick Corea - The Song of Singing (4/7/70, 4/8/70)
4354: Jeremy Steig - Wayfaring Stranger (2/11/70)
4355: Joe Williams - Worth Waiting For (5/5/70)
4356: Ornette Coleman - Love Call (4/29/68, 5/7/68)
4357: Candido Camero - Beautiful (10/20/70, 10/27/70)
4358: Jack McDuff - Who Knows What Tomorrow's Gonna Bring? (12/1-3/70)
4359: Lou Donaldson - Pretty Things (1/9/70, 6/12/70)
4360: Grant Green - Alive! (8/15/70)
4361: Elvin Jones - Coalition (7/17/70)
4362: Bobby Hutcherson - San Francisco (7/15/70)
4363: Wayne Shorter - Odyssey of Iska (8/26/70)
4364: Jimmy McGriff - Something to Listen To (9/??/70)
4365: Reuben Wilson - A Groovy Situation (9/18/70, 9/25/70)
4366: John Patton - (unissued) (10/2/70)
4367: Hank Mobley - Thinking of Home (LT 1045) (7/31/70)
4368: Horace Silver - Total Response (11/15/70, 1/29/71)
4369: Elvin Jones - Genesis (2/12/71)
4370: Lou Donaldson - Cosmos (7/16/71)
4371: Lonnie Smith (unissued) (5/21/70)
4372: Richard Groove Holmes - Comin' on Home (5/19/71)
4373: Grant Green - Visions (5/21/71)
4374: Jimmy McGriff - Black Pearl (2/??/71)
4375: Ornette Coleman (unissued)
4376: Bobby Hutcherson - Head On (7/1/71, 7/3/71)
4377: Reuben Wilson - Set Us Free (7/23/71)
4378: Gene Harris - The 3 Sounds (7/26-27/71, 8/2-3/71)
4379: Bobbi Humphrey - Flute In (9/30/71, 10/1/71)
4380: Donald Byrd - Ethiopian Knights (8/25/71, 8/26/71)
4381: Lee Morgan (unissued) (9/17/71, 9/18/71)
4382: Ronnie Foster - Two Headed Freap (1/20/72, 1/21/72)
4383-4412: not used
4413: Grant Green - Shades of Green (11/23/71, 11/24/71)
4414: Elvin Jones - Merry-Go-Round (12/15/71)
4415: Grant Green - The Final Comedown (12/13/71, 12/14/71)
4416: Bobby Hutcherson - Natural Illusions (3/2/72, 3/3/72)
4417: Hank Mobley - Thinking of Home (LT 1045) (7/31/70)
4418: John Patton - Memphis to New York Spirit (issued 1996) (10/2/70)
4419: McCoy Tyner - Extensions (LA 006-F) (2/9/70)
4420: Horace Silver - All (1/17/72, 2/14/72)
4421: Bobbi Humphrey - Dig This! (7/20/72, 7/21/72)
4422: Marlena Shaw - Marlena (8/10/72, 8/11/72, 8/16/72)
4423: Gene Harris - Gene Harris of the Three Sounds (6/29/72, 6/30/72)
4424: Stanley Turrentine - ZT's Blues (9/13/61)
4425: Hank Mobley - Far Away Lands (5/26/67)
4426: Lee Morgan - The Rajah (11/29/66)
4427: Jackie McLean - Tippin' the Scales (9/28/62)
4428: Clifford Brown - Alternate Takes (6/9/53, 6/20/53, 8/28/53)
4429: Various Artists - The Best of Blue Note, Volume 1
4430: Bud Powell - Alternate Takes (8/8/49, 8/14/53, 8/3/57, 5/28/58, ...)
4431: Hank Mobley - Another Workout (3/26/61, 12/5/61)
4432: Grant Green - Born to Be Blue (3/1/62, 12/23/61)
4433: Various Artists - The Best of Blue Note, Volume 2
4434: The Three Sounds - Babe's Blues (8/13/61)
4435: Hank Mobley - Straight No Filter (3/7/63, 2/5/65, 6/17/66)

BN-LA series
12" LP's issued during the 1970s using the numbering sequence of parent company United Artists Records with an extra prefix. The suffix is a code for the list price of the album and whether it is a two-disc set. In this series there are many reissues from earlier series, "Best of" albums, live albums and compilations, as well as new studio albums.

BN-LA 006-F: McCoy Tyner - Extensions
BN-LA 007-G: Moacir Santos - Maestro
BN-LA 014-G: Wayne Shorter - Moto Grosso Feio
BN-LA 015-G2: Elvin Jones - Live at the Lighthouse
BN-LA 024-G: Lou Donaldson - Sophisticated Lou
BN-LA 037-G2: Grant Green - Live at the Lighthouse
BN-LA 047-F: Donald Byrd - Black Byrd
BN-LA 054-F: Horace Silver - In Pursuit of the 27th Man
BN-LA 059-F: Alphonse Mouzon - The Essence of Mystery
BN-LA 098-G: Ronnie Foster - Sweet Revival
BN-LA 099-G: Mickey Tucker / Roland Hanna - The New Heritage Keyboard Quartet
BN-LA 109-F: Lou Donaldson - Sassy Soul Strut
BN-LA 110-F: Elvin Jones - Mr. Jones
BN-LA 140-F: Donald Byrd - Street Lady
BN-LA 141-G2: Gene Harris - Yesterday, Today & Tomorrow
BN-LA 142-G: Bobbi Humphrey - Blacks and Blues
BN-LA 143-F: Marlena Shaw - From the Depths of My Soul
BN-LA 152-F: Herbie Hancock / Willie Bobo - Succotash
BN-LA 158-G2: V.A. - Decades of Jazz, Vol. 1
BN-LA 159-G2: V.A. - Decades of Jazz, Vol. 2
BN-LA 160-G2: V.A. - Decades of Jazz, Vol. 3
BN-LA 169-F: Cannonball Adderley - Somethin' Else
BN-LA 170-G2: The Jazz Crusaders - Tough Talk
BN-LA 171-G2: Les McCann - Fish This Week
BN-LA 222-G: Alphonse Mouzon - Funky Snakefoot
BN-LA 223-G: McCoy Tyner - Asante
BN-LA 224-G: Lee Morgan - The Last Session
BN-LA 237-G2: Grant Green Best Album
BN-LA 249-G: Bobby Hutcherson - Live at Montreux
BN-LA 250-G: Ronnie Foster - Live at Montreux
BN-LA 251-G: Marlena Shaw - Live at Montreux
BN-LA 252-G: Bobbi Humphrey - Live at Montreux
BN-LA 257-G: Bobby Hutcherson - Cirrus
BN-LA 258-G: Don Minasi - When Joanna Loved Me
BN-LA 259-G: Lou Donaldson - Sweet Lou
BN-LA 260-G: Moacir Santos - Saudade
BN-LA 261-G: Ronnie Foster - On the Avenue
BN-LA 267-G: Clifford Brown - Brownie Eyes
BN-LA 313-G: Gene Harris - Astral Signal
BN-LA 317-G: Duke Pearson - It Could Only Happen with You
BN-LA 344-G: Bobbi Humphrey - Satin Doll
BN-LA 356-H2: Freddie Hubbard Best Album
BN-LA 368-G: Donald Byrd - Stepping into Tomorrow
BN-LA 369-G: Bobby Hutcherson - Linger Lane
BN-LA 370-G: The Waters - Waters
BN-LA 392-H2: The Thad Jones / Mel Lewis Orchestra - Thad Jones - Mel Lewis Best Album
BN-LA 393-H2: Dexter Gordon Best Album
BN-LA 394-H2: Stanley Turrentine Best Album
BN-LA 395-H2: Chick Corea Best Album
BN-LA 397-G: Marlena Shaw - Who Is This Bitch, Anyway?
BN-LA 398-G: Alphonse Mouzon - Mind Transplant
BN-LA 399-H2: Herbie Hancock Best Album
BN-LA 400-H2: Jimmy Smith Best Album
BN-LA 401-H2: Sonny Rollins Best Album
BN-LA 402-H2: Horace Silver Best Album
BN-LA 406-G: Horace Silver - Silver 'n Brass
BN-LA 425-G: Ronnie Foster - Cheshire Cat
BN-LA 426-G: Don Minasi - I Have the Feeling I've Been Here Before
BN-LA 451-H2: Paul Chambers / John Coltrane - High Step
BN-LA 452-G: Ronnie Laws - Pressure Sensitive
BN-LA 453-H2: Sam Rivers - Involution
BN-LA 456-H2: Lester Young - The Aladdin Sessions
BN-LA 457-H2: Jackie McLean - Jacknife
BN-LA 458-H2: Cecil Taylor - In Transition
BN-LA 459-H2: Andrew Hill - One for One
BN-LA 460-H2: McCoy Tyner - Cosmos
BN-LA 461-H2: Gil Evans - Pacific Standard Time (compilation of New Bottle Old Wine and Great Jazz Standards originally released on World Pacific Records)
BN-LA 462-G: Carmen McRae - I Am Music
BN-LA 463-G: Moacir Santos - Carnival of the Spirits
BN-LA 464-G: Eddie Henderson - Sunburst
BN-LA 472-H2: Chick Corea - Circling In
BN-LA 473-J2: Art Blakey - Live Messengers
BN-LA 474-H2: Horace Silver - The Trio Sides
BN-LA 475-H2: Sonny Rollins - More from the Vanguard
BN-LA 483-H2: Jackie McLean - Hipnosis
BN-LA 485-H2: Herbie Nichols - The Third World
BN-LA 488-H2: Booker Ervin - Back from the Gig
BN-LA 496-H2: Freddie Hubbard - Here to Stay
BN-LA 506-H2: Elvin Jones - The Prime Element
BN-LA 507-H2: Fats Navarro - Prime Source
BN-LA 519-G: Gene Harris - Nexus
BN-LA 520-H2: Chico Hamilton - Peregrinations
BN-LA 521-H2: Johnny Griffin / John Coltrane / Hank Mobley - Blowin' Sessions
BN-LA 529-H2: Paul Horn - Paul Horn in India
BN-LA 530-H2: The Jazz Crusaders - The Young Rabbits
BN-LA 531-H2: Wes Montgomery - Beginnings
BN-LA 532-H2: Gerry Mulligan / Lee Konitz - Revelation
BN-LA 533-H2: T-Bone Walker - Classics of Modern Blues
BN-LA 534-G: Jimmy Witherspoon - Spoonful
BN-LA 541-G: John Lee / Gerry Brown - Mango Sunrise
BN-LA 549-G: Donald Byrd - Places and Spaces
BN-LA 550-G: Bobbi Humphrey - Fancy Dancer
BN-LA 551-G: Bobby Hutcherson - Montara
BN-LA 579-H2: Thelonious Monk - The Complete Genius
BN-LA 581-G Horace Silver - Silver 'n Wood
BN-LA 582-J2: Lee Morgan - The Procrastinator
BN-LA 584-G: Alphonse Mouzon - The Man Incognito
BN-LA 590-H2: Milt Jackson - All Star Bags
BN-LA 591-H2: Art Pepper - Early Art
BN-LA 596-G: Earl Klugh - Earl Klugh
BN-LA 598-H2: Randy Weston - Little Niles
BN-LA 606-G: Marlena Shaw - Just a Matter of Time
BN-LA 615-G: Bobby Hutcherson - Waiting
BN-LA 622-G: Chico Hamilton - Chico Hamilton and the Prayers
BN-LA 628-H: Ronnie Laws - Fever
BN-LA 632-H2: Jean-Luc Ponty - Cantaloupe Island
BN-LA 633-G: Donald Byrd - Caricatures
BN-LA 634-G: Gene Harris - In a Special Way
BN-LA 635-G: Carmen McRae - Can't Hide Love
BN-LA 636-G: Eddie Henderson - Heritage
BN-LA 645-G: Barbara Carroll
BN-LA 663-J2: V.A. - Blue Note Live at the Roxy
BN-LA 664-G: Robbie Krieger - Robbie Krieger and Friends
BN-LA 667-G: Earl Klugh - Living Inside Your Love
BN-LA 690-J2: War - Platinum Jazz
BN-LA 699-G: Bobbi Humphrey's Best
BN-LA 700-G: Donald Byrd's Best
BN-LA 701-G: John Lee / Gerry Brown - Still Can't Say Enough
BN-LA 708-G: Horace Silver - Silver 'n Voices
BN-LA 709-H2: Carmen McRae - Carmen McRae at the Great American Music Hall
BN-LA 710-G: Bobby Hutcherson - The View from the Inside
BN-LA 711-G: Willie Bobo - Tomorrow Is Here
BN-LA 730-H: Ronnie Laws - Friends & Strangers
BN-LA 736-H: Noel Pointer - Phantazia
BN-LA 737-H: Earl Klugh - Finger Paintings
BN-LA 738-G: Maxi Anderson - Maxi
BN-LA 760-H: Gene Harris - Tone Tantrum
BN-LA 789-G: Bobby Hutcherson - Knucklebean
BN-LA 819-H: Rico Rodriguez - Man from Wareika
BN-LA 853-H: Horace Silver - Silver 'n Percussion
BN-LA 870-H: V.A. - Blue Note Meet the L.A. Philharmonic
BN-LA 882-J2: Chick Corea - Circulus
BN-LA 883-J2: Stanley Turrentine - Jubilee Shout!!!
BN-LA 945-H: Horace Silver - Sterling Silver

LT series
After EMI acquired United Artists Records, Blue Note LPs continued to appear with catalog numbers taken from the main numbering sequence of UA and its successor, the revived Liberty Records. This is effectively a continuation of the BN-LA series without UA's letter codes. Albums in this series appeared in the late 1970s and early 1980s.
987: Lee Morgan - Sonic Boom (4/14/67, 4/28/67)
988: Wayne Shorter - The Soothsayer (3/4/65)
989: Dexter Gordon -Clubhouse (5/27/65)
990: Grant Green - Solid (6/12/64)
991: Donald Byrd - Chant (4/17/61)
992: Jimmy Smith - Confirmation (8/25/57, 2/25/58)
993: Stanley Turrentine - New Time Shuffle (2/17/67, 6/23/67)
994: Jackie McLean - Consequence (12/3/65)
995: Hank Mobley - A Slice of the Top (3/18/66)
996: Bobby Hutcherson - Spiral (4/3/65, 11/11/68)
1028: Lou Donaldson - Midnight Sun (7/22/60)
1030: Andrew Hill - Dance with Death (10/11/68)
1031: Lee Morgan - Taru (2/15/68)
1032: Grant Green - Nigeria (1/13/62)
1033: Horace Silver - Silver 'n Strings Play the Music of the Spheres (11/3/78, 11/10/78, 10/26/79, 11/2/79)
1037: Stanley Turrentine - In Memory Of (6/3/64)
1038: Larry Young - Mother Ship (2/7/69)
1044: Bobby Hutcherson - Patterns (3/14/68)
1045: Hank Mobley - Thinking of Home (7/31/70)
1046: The Jazz Crusaders - Live Sides
1051: Dexter Gordon - Landslide (5/9/61, 5/5/62, 6/25/62)
1052: Ike Quebec - With a Song in My Heart (2/5/62, 2/13/62)
1053: Joe Pass - The Complete "Catch Me!" Sessions
1054: Jimmy Smith - Cool Blues (4/7/58)
1055: Vic Dickenson / Bobby Hackett - Mainstreamin''' (not released)
1056: Wayne Shorter - Et Cetera (6/14/65)
1057: Harold Land - Take Aim (7/25/60)
1058: Lee Morgan - Tom Cat (8/11/64)
1064: Art Pepper - Omega Alpha (4/1/57)
1065: Art Blakey and the Jazz Messengers - Once Upon a Groove (1/14/57, 2/11/57)
1075: Stanley Turrentine - Mr. Natural (9/4/64)
1076: Leo Parker - Rollin' with Leo (10/12/61, 10/20/61)
1081: Hank Mobley - Third Season (2/24/67)
1082: Blue Mitchell - Step Lightly (8/13/63)
1085: Jackie McLean - Vertigo (5/2/59, 6/14/62, 2/11/63)
1086: Bobby Hutcherson - Medina (8/11/69)
1088: Art Blakey and the Jazz Messengers - Africaine (11/10/59)
1089: Ike Quebec - Congo Lament (1/20/62)
1091: Lee Morgan - Infinity (11/16/65)
1092: Jimmy Smith - On the Sunny Side (8/25/57, 6/15/58, 6/16/59, 4/25/60)
1095: Stanley Turrentine - Ain't No Way (5/10/68, 6/23/69)
1096: Donald Byrd - The Creeper (10/6/61)
1100: Bob Brookmeyer / Bill Evans - As Time Goes By (3/12/59)
1101: Gerry Mulligan - Freeway (6/10/52, 7/9/52, 8/16/52, 10/15/52)
1102: Jean-Luc Ponty - Live at Donte's (3/11/69, 3/12/69)
1103: Joe Pass - Joy Spring (2/6/64)

 85100 
Series of new studio albums as well as a few reissues released c.1985-87, following Blue Note's reestablishment.
 85101: Stanley Jordan - Magic Touch 85102: McCoy Tyner / Jackie McLean - It's About Time 85103: George Russell - The African Game 85104: Charles Lloyd - A Night in Copenhagen 85105: Stanley Turrentine - Straight Ahead 85106: Kenny Burrell / Grover Washington Jr. - Togethering 85107: Bennie Wallace - Twilight Time 85108: Charlie Parker - At Storyville 85109: James Newton - The African Flower 85110: Bobby McFerrin - Spontaneous Inventions 85111: Bill Evans - The Alternative Man 85112: Dexter Gordon - Nights at the Keystone 85113: One Night with Blue Note, Vol. 1 85114: One Night with Blue Note, Vol. 2 85115: One Night with Blue Note, Vol. 3 85116: One Night with Blue Note, Vol. 4 85117: One Night with Blue Note, Preserved 85118: Out of the Blue - OTB 85119: Tony Williams - Foreign Intrigue 85120: not used
 85121: Freddie Hubbard / Woody Shaw - Double Take 85122: Don Pullen / George Adams - Breakthrough 85123: Joe Henderson - The State of the Tenor Live at the Village Vanguard, Vol. 1 85124: Michel Petrucciani - Pianism 85125: Jimmy Smith - Go for Whatcha Know 85126: Joe Henderson - The State of the Tenor Live at the Village Vanguard, Vol. 2 85127: Blue Note '86: A New Generation of Jazz 85128: Out of the Blue - Inside Track 85129: Duke Ellington - Money Jungle 85130: Stanley Jordan - Standards, Vol. 1 85131: Eric Dolphy - Other Aspects 85132: George Russell - So What 85133: Michel Petrucciani - Power of Three 85134: James Newton - Romance and Revolution 85135: Dexter Gordon - The Other Side of Round Midnight 85136: James "Blood" Ulmer - America – Do You Remember the Love? 85137: Kenny Burrell and the Jazz Guitar Band - Generation 85138: Tony Williams - Civilization 85139: Freddie Hubbard - Life Flight 85140: Stanley Turrentine - Wonderland 85141: Out of the Blue - Live at Mt. FujiOther series

1600
These CDs make available originally unissued material from the sessions from the 1500 series. They were manufactured by Toshiba-EMI and use 20-bit, 88.2 kHz recording technology.
1601: Various Artists - Blue Trails: The Rare Tracks1602: Art Blakey - A Night in Birdland, Volume 3 (2/21/54)
1603: The Jazz Messengers - At the Cafe Bohemia, Volume 3 (11/23/55)
1604: Thelonious Monk - Genius of Modern Music, Volume 3 (10/15/47, 10/24/47, 11/21/47, 7/23/51, 5/30/52)
1605: Clifford Brown - More Memorable Tracks (6/9/53, 8/28/53)
1606: Kenny Dorham - 'Round About Midnight at the Cafe Bohemia Volume 2 (5/31/56)
1607: Kenny Dorham - 'Round About Midnight at the Cafe Bohemia Volume 3 (5/31/56)
1608: Herbie Nichols - Herbie Nichols Trio, Volume 2 (8/7/55, 4/19/56)
1609: Kenny Burrell, Volume 3 (3/12/56, 5/29/56, 5/31/56)
1610: Jimmy Smith / Lou Donaldson - Jimmy Smith Trio + LD (7/4/57)
1611: Hank Mobley / Sonny Clark - Curtain Call (8/18/57)
1612: Jimmy Smith - Cherokee1613: Sonny Rollins - A Night at the Village Vanguard, Volume 2 (11/3/57)
1614: Sonny Rollins - A Night at the Village Vanguard, Volume 3 (11/3/57)
1615: Jimmy Smith - Lonesome Road1616: Tina Brooks - Minor Move (3/16/58)
1617: Sonny Clark Trio - The 45 Sessions (9/13/57, 11/16/58)
1618: Sonny Clark - Blues in the Night (12/7/58)
1619: Bennie Green - The 45 Session (11/23/58)
1620: Hank Mobley - Poppin' (10/20/57)

5000 series
The Blue Note Modern Jazz Series began late in 1951 with the following 10" monaural LPs. Some of these LPs were later reissued as part of the Blue Note 1500 Series of 12" LPs. At first, recordings were made in various studios in New York (Reeves Sound Studio, WOR Studios, Apex Studios, Audio Video Studios). Beginning in October 1953, however, most Blue Note sessions took place in Rudy Van Gelder's home studio in Hackensack, New Jersey. The sessions were produced by Alfred Lion and engineered by Van Gelder, and many LP covers featured photographs by Lion's partner in Blue Note Francis Wolff.
5001: Ike Quebec / Charlie Christian among others - Mellow the Mood (2/5/44, 6/18/44, 9/25/44, 7/17/45, 5/31/46, 1/31/55)
5002: Thelonious Monk - Genius of Modern Music (10/15/47, 11/21/47, 7/2/48) [1500 Series: BLP ]
5003: The Amazing Bud Powell (8/9/49, 5/1/51) [BLP 1503]
5004: Fats Navarro / Tadd Dameron - Fats Navarro Memorial Album (9/26/47, 9/13/48, 10/11/48, 8/8/49) [BLP ]
5005: James Moody with Strings conducted by André Hodeir (7/13/51)
5006: James Moody and His Modernists (10/18/48, 10/25/48)
5007: Erroll Garner - Overture to Dawn, Volume 1 (12/14/44)
5008: Erroll Garner - Overture to Dawn, Volume 2 (12/26/44)
5009: Thelonious Monk - Genius of Modern Music, Vol. 2 (10/15/47, 10/24/47, 11/21/47, 7/23/51) []
5010: Max Roach / James Moody / Kenny Dorham Quintet/Art Blakey - New Sounds (12/22/47, 4/30/49, 5/15/49)
5011: Milt Jackson - Wizard of the Vibes (7/23/51, 4/7/52) [BLP 1509]
5012: Howard McGhee's All-Stars - The McGhee / Navarro Boptet (1948, 1/23/50)
5013: Miles Davis - Young Man with a Horn (5/9/52) [BLP ]
5014: Erroll Garner - Overture to Dawn, Volume 3 (11/24/44, 12/23/44, 12/25/44)
5015: Erroll Garner - Overture to Dawn, Volume 4 (11/16/44, 12/20/44, 12/23/44, 12/25/44)
5016: Erroll Garner - Overture to Dawn, Volume 5 (12/14/44, 12/26/44)
5017: Dizzy Gillespie - Horn of Plenty (3/2/47, 4/11/52)
5018: Horace Silver Trio - New Faces, New Sounds (10/9/52, 10/20/52) [BLP 1520]
5019: The Swinging Swedes / The Cool Britons - New Sounds from the Old World (7/29/50, 9/5/51)
5020: Gil Mellé Quintet/Sextet - New Faces, New Sounds (3/2/52, 1/31/53)
5021: Lou Donaldson / Horace Silver a.o. - New Faces, New Sounds (6/20/52, 11/19/52) [BLP 1537]
5022: Miles Davis Volume 2 (4/20/53) [BLP ]
5023: Kenny Drew Trio - New Faces, New Sounds (4/16/53)
5024: Howard McGhee / Gigi Gryce a.o. - Howard McGhee, Volume 2 (6/8/53)
5025: Wynton Kelly Trio - New Faces, New Sounds (7/25/51, 8/1/51)
5026: Meade Lux Lewis / Charlie Christian a.o. - Memorable Sessions (1/25/44, 2/5/51)
5027: Benny Morton / Ben Webster a.o. - Swing Hi, Swing Lo (1/31/45, 7/17/45, 11/21/45, 9/23/46)
5028: Jay Jay Johnson with Clifford Brown (6/20/53) [BLP ]
5029: Elmo Hope Trio - New Faces, New Sounds (6/53)
5030: Lou Donaldson / Clifford Brown a.o. - New Faces, New Sounds (6/9/53) [BLP 5030]
5031: Wade Legge Trio - New Faces, New Sounds (2/27/53)
5032: Clifford Brown - New Star on the Horizon (8/28/53) [BLP 5032]
5033: Gil Mellé Quintet, Vol. 2 (3/25/53)
5034: Horace Silver Trio, Volume 2 / Art Blakey - Spotlight on Drums (11/23/53) [BLP 1520]
5035: Sal Salvador Quintet (12/24/53)
5036: Urbie Green Septet - New Faces, New Sounds (12/27/53)
5037: Art Blakey Quintet - A Night at Birdland Vol. 1 (2/21/54) [BLP ]
5038: Art Blakey Quintet - A Night at Birdland Vol. 2 (2/21/54) [BLP ]
5039: Art Blakey Quintet - A Night at Birdland Vol. 3 (2/21/54) [BLP ]
5040: Miles Davis, Volume 3 (3/6/54) [BLP ]
5041: The Amazing Bud Powell, Vol. 2 (8/14/53) [BLP 1504]
5042: Tal Farlow Quartet (4/11/54)
5043: Frank Foster Quintet - New Faces, New Sounds (5/5/54)
5044: Elmo Hope Quintet - New Faces, New Sounds, Vol. 2 (6/54)
5045: George Wallington and His Band (5/12/54)
5046: Lionel Hampton - Jazztime Paris (9/28/53)
5047: Clifford Brown Quartet (10/15/53)
5048: Gigi Gryce / Clifford Brown Sextet (10/8/53)
5049: Gigi Gryce / Clifford Brown - Jazztime Paris, Volume 1 (9/10/53)
5050: Gigi Gryce / Clifford Brown - Jazztime Paris, Volume 2 (9/10/53)
5051: Gigi Gryce / Clifford Brown - Jazztime Paris, Volume 3 (9/10/53)
5052: The Cool Britons - New Sounds from Olde England (5/13/54, 5/15/54)
5053: Julius Watkins Sextet - New Faces, New Sounds (8/54)
5054: Gil Mellé Quartet - New Faces, New Sounds, Volume 3 (9/5/54)
5055: Lou Donaldson Sextet, Volume 2 (8/22/54) [BLP 1537]
5056: Jutta Hipp Quintet - New Faces, New Sounds from Germany (4/24/54)
5057: The Eminent Jay Jay Johnson (9/24/54) [BLP ]
5058: Horace Silver Quintet, Volume 1 (11/13/54) [BLP 1518]
5059: Conte Candoli / Herb Geller a.o. - Best from the West, Volume 1 (12/31/54, 1/55)
5060: Conte Candoli / Herb Geller a.o. - Best from the West, Volume 2 (12/31/54, 1/55)
5061: The Swinging Fats Sadi Combo (1954)
5062: Horace Silver Quintet, Volume 2 (2/6/55) [BLP 1518]
5063: Gil Mellé Quintet, Vol. 4: Five Impressions of Color (2/27/55)
5064: Julius Watkins Sextet, Volume 2 (3/20/55)
5065: Kenny Dorham Octet - Afro-Cuban (3/29/55) [BLP 1535]
5066: Hank Mobley - Hank Mobley Quartet (3/27/55)
5067: Lou Mecca Quartet (3/25/55)
5068: The Prophetic Herbie Nichols Vol. 1 (5/4/55, 5/13/55)
5069: The Prophetic Herbie Nichols Vol. 2 (5/4/55, 5/13/55)
5070: The Eminent Jay Jay Johnson, Volume 3 (6/6/55) [BLP 1506]

7000 series
The 'traditional series' of 10" LPs consisted of new recordings and reissues of material from the 78 era. Some of this material was repackaged in the short-lived 1200 series of 12" LPs.
BLP 7001: Sidney Bechet's Blue Note Jazzmen with "Wild Bill" DavisonBLP 7002: Sidney Bechet - Jazz Classics, Vol. 1BLP 7003: Sidney Bechet - Jazz Classics, Vol. 2BLP 7004: Art Hodes and His Chicagoans - The Best in 2 BeatBLP 7005: Art Hodes' Hot Five with Sidney Bechet and "Wild Bill" DavisonBLP 7006: Art Hodes' Blue Note Jazz Men - Dixieland JubileeBLP 7007: Edmond Hall / Sidney DeParis - Jamming in Jazz: Hall-DeParis' Blue Note Jazz MenBLP 7008: Sidney Bechet / Bunk Johnson - Days Beyond RecallBLP 7009: Sidney Bechet and His Blue Note Jazz Men with "Wild Bill" DavisonBLP 7010: George Lewis and His New Orleans Stompers, Vol. 1 - Echoes of New OrleansBLP 7011: James P. Johnson - Rent PartyBLP 7012: James P. Johnson's Blue Note Jazzmen - Jazz Band BallBLP 7013: George Lewis and His New Orleans Stompers, Vol. 2 - Echoes of New OrleansBLP 7014: Sidney Bechet's Blue Note Jazzmen with "Wild Bill" Davison, Vol. 2BLP 7015: Art Hodes' Hot Seven with Max Kaminsky and Bujie Centobie - Dixieland ClambakeBLP 7016: Sidney DeParis' Blue Note Stompers with Jimmy Archey and Omer SimeonBLP 7017: Albert Ammons Memorial Album - Boogie Woogie ClassicsBLP 7018: Meade Lux Lewis - Boogie Woogie ClassicsBLP 7019: Pete Johnson - Boogie Woogie Blues and SkiffleBLP 7020: The Fabulous Sidney Bechet and His Hot Six with Sidney DeParisBLP 7021: Art Hodes' Back Room Boys - Out of the Back RoomBLP 7022: Sidney Bechet - Port of Harlem SixBLP 7023: Mezz Mezzrow and His Band Featuring Lee Collins and Zutty SingletonBLP 7024: Sidney Bechet - Jazz Festival Concert, Paris 1952, Vol. 1BLP 7025: Sidney Bechet - Jazz Festival Concert, Paris 1952, Vol. 2BLP 7026: Dixie by the Fabulous Sidney BechetBLP 7027: George Lewis and His New Orleans Stompers, Vol. 3BLP 7028: George Lewis and His New Orleans Stompers, Vol. 4BLP 7029: Sidney Bechet - Olympia Concert, Paris 1954, Vol. 1BLP 7030: Sidney Bechet - Olympia Concert, Paris 1954, Vol. 2 (not released)

9000
Only two albums were released in this series:
BLP 9001: Dodo Greene - My Hour of NeedBLP 9002: Sheila Jordan - Portrait of SheilaCompilations
1996: The New Groove: The Blue Note Remix Project2003: Madlib - Shades of Blue (Madlib Invades Blue Note)2003: Untinted: Sources for Madlib's Shades of Blue2003: Blue Note Trip Series
2004: Blue Note Revisited2015: Supreme Sonacy, Vol. 12020: Blue Note Re:imaginedBibliography

 Cook, Richard. Blue Note Records: A Biography. .
 Cuscuna, Michael & Michel Ruppli. The Blue Note Label: A Discography.  [2nd ed 2001]
 Marsh, Graham & Glyn Callingham. Blue Note: Album Cover Art. .
 Marsh, Graham Blue Note 2: The Album Cover Art: The Finest in Jazz Since 1939.    [US edition]
 Wolff, Francis et al. Blue Note Jazz Photography of Francis Wolff''. .

Jazz discographies
Discographies of American record labels